Allenwood is a small Irish village in County Kildare situated on the Grand Canal. According to the CSO, Allenwood had a total population of 981 inhabitants as of the 2016 census, an increase from 845 in the 2011 census.
The main road through Allenwood is the R403 and the village is within  of both the M4 (to the north) and M7 (to the south) motorways.

Businesses in the area are centred on the crossroads, and consist of several shops, including a Spar, a costcutter, a barbers and a public house. There are two primary schools that were amalgamated into one in 2017, Allenwood G.N.S built in 1957 and Allenwood B.N.S built in 1929. The school is located next to the church which was built in 1954.  There is also a business park at the location of the old power station.
The Grand Canal is traversed by means of a noteworthy bridge, known locally as the Shee Bridge.

History
Allenwood was developed in the nineteenth century as a coaching post along the Edenderry Road. Later residential development primarily occurred on local roads to the east of the village, typically as single plot developments.

Allenwood is the location of a former electricity power station which was fueled by peat from the surrounding bog lands. The station was built in 1952 by the Electricity Supply Board (ESB).

Bord na Móna which processed peat on the local boglands, established a camp for its workers at Allenwood Cross and the Roadstone quarry in Allen is also nearby.  The industrial park located to the north-west of the village has grown around the location of the former ESB power plant.

Recent developments

Allenwood has undergone expansion in the early 21st century, with a two-fold population increase (from 481 to 981 inhabitants) between the 2002 and 2016 censuses. Several larger homes have been built in the area as well as a number of housing estates and apartments. As of Spring 2019, there were three housing estates under development.
Traffic lights were also added in late 2016 at the towns major crossroads. There is now provision for a new playground and the proposed Grand Canal Greenway would be a local amenity.

Sport and recreation
The close proximity to the Grand Canal makes Allenwood a destination for fishing and walking.
The local football club Allenwood G.F.C. is situated on the Station Road and offers its premises for a variety of other sports and recreations including kick boxing, dancing, scouting and annual school sports days. 
The local soccer club, Allenwood Celtic, is located outside the village on the Edenderry Road. There were several golf courses within a  range of the village, but the nearest ones are now closed.

Notable people
 Johnny Doyle, Kildare Senior Footballer and All Star.

See also
List of towns and villages in Ireland

References

External links
Allenwood Community Development Association
Allenwood G.F.C.
Allenwood Celtic A.F.C.

Towns and villages in County Kildare